Jean Fritz Louis Boom (born 9 January 2000) is a Haitian footballer who plays as a centre-back for Ermis Aradippou and the Haiti national team.

Career
A youth product of Maastricht, and ADO Den Haag, Boom moved to the reserves of Fortuna Sittard on 19 June 2020. He transferred to the Cypriot side Ermis Aradippou FC on 18 August 2021.

International career
Born in Haiti and raised in the Netherlands, Boom was on the standby list for the Netherlands U17s in January 2017. He was called up to the Haiti U23s in 2020, but the games got postponed due to the outbreak of COVID-19. Boom made his debut with the Haiti in a friendly 6–1 loss to Bahrain on 2 September 2021.

References

External links
 
 

2000 births
Living people
Sportspeople from Port-au-Prince
Haitian footballers
Dutch footballers
Haitian emigrants to the Netherlands
Ermis Aradippou FC players
Haiti international footballers
Haitian expatriate footballers
Expatriate footballers in Cyprus
Haitian expatriate sportspeople in Cyprus
Association football defenders